Jonas Breum (born in 1979) is a Danish singer and songwriter.

In 1997, he started at age 18 when he released his demo as a download album entitled Manuskript uden titel. He then formed the Danish pop/rock band Coolsville in which he was songwriter and lead vocalist. The band released in May 2005 their album Langt fra landet with resulting singles "Det gælder", "Brændt af" and "Tog til møde ved en fejl". After the breakup of the band, Jonas Breum launched a solo musical career with his debut solo studio album Fremtiden findes hos hende jeg forlod

Discography

Albums
with Coolsville
2005: Langt fra landet
solo

Others
1997: Manuskript uden titel (demo)

Singles
2012: "Fjendemin"

References

External links
Blog

Danish songwriters
1979 births
Living people
21st-century Danish male singers